Barger-Erfscheidenveen is a hamlet in the Netherlands and it is part of the Emmen municipality in Drenthe.

Barger-Erfscheidenveen is a statistical entity, however the postal authorities have placed it under Nieuw-Amsterdam. It was first mentioned in the 1850 as Het Erfscheiden Veen. The current name translates to "bog property boundaty of Barge". In 1904, a school was established. In 1932, it was home to 512 people. In 1985, the school closed. A part of the hamlet has been demolished during the construction of the A37 motorway.

References 

Populated places in Drenthe
Emmen, Netherlands